Modak Sagar is a lake located in Thane district on the Vaitarna River. It has an overflow level of 163.15 meters, making it the second largest of the lakes supplying water to the city of Mumbai.

History
Special engineer Mr. N.V.Modak also known as Nanasaheb Modak, who designed and executed Mumbai's Marine drive was the author of 'Outline of the master plan for Greater Bombay' which is still in the archives of Municipal Corporation of Greater Mumbai.

To solve the potable water supply issue for Mumbai, he took up the project and inspected all the three districts of Nashik, Pune and Thane and found that the Vaitarna river flowing from Igatpuri in Nashik district to Khardi in Thane district has a good flow of water. They built a 
dam on the river nearby and built a lake.

The dam was built in 1956. From that lake, water started coming to Mumbai every day from 1957. In memory of this talented engineer, the corporation named the lake 'Modaksagar' after Nanasaheb Modak.

Access

The Dam premises are protected by the state government. Access is only for officials from the MCGM, however if anyone wishes to see the dam you need to take permission from their head office at CST.

Hydrology and dam features

Flora and fauna

The lake is home to crocodiles that inhabit the shallow waters near its coast

Limnology

References

PDF: Outline of Master plan for Greater Bombay

Lakes of Mumbai
Dams in Thane district
Reservoirs in Maharashtra
1956 establishments in Bombay State